Thena Jasper was an African American singer and actress who worked during Hollywood's silent era.

Biography 
A native of Pennsylvania, Jasper moved to Los Angeles with her husband Adolph (a baseball manager) by the early 1910s and began appearing in a string of mostly uncredited roles, often playing maids to wealthy white characters. She once told a reporter, "If I had all the money represented by all the ‘millionaire’ characters I’ve worked for in the pictures, I'd never have to work again.”

Selected filmography 

 Under the Lash (1921)
 The Outside Woman (1921)
 The Strange Boarder (1920)
 The Man Who Had Everything (1920)
 The Ladder of Lies (1920)
 Miss Hobbs (1920)

References 

African-American actresses
Actresses from Pennsylvania
American film actresses
1892 births
20th-century deaths
Year of death missing
20th-century American actresses
20th-century African-American women
20th-century African-American people